Matawan Creek is a creek and partially a tidal inlet of Raritan Bay. It lies in Monmouth County, New Jersey across from Staten Island, New York.

Course
Matawan Creek's main flow begins as Bakers Brook in Marlboro Township, Monmouth County, north of the intersection of Tennent and Woolleytown Roads. From this point it flows northward through Marlboro and Aberdeen Townships to a point near the Middlesex County line, where it turns in a northeasterly direction. Birch Swamp Brook enters from the right; below this confluence is the impoundment, Lake Lefferts. The section of Bakers Brook in Aberdeen Township is also known as Matawan Brook.

Lake Lefferts lies in Aberdeen Township and Matawan Borough and passes under County Route 516 and New Jersey Route 34. Below the dam at Ravine Drive Matawan Creek becomes a tidal estuary, meandering through a salt marsh to its mouth. Here it receives the flow of Gravelly Brook, Clapboard Creek and Mohingson Creek and reenters Aberdeen Township. This section was formerly navigable to commercial shipping.

Between the Garden State Parkway and New Jersey Route 35 the creek becomes navigable for small private craft and some residences fronting upon the creek have private docks. Downstream of Route 35 are several marinas, although since both the bridge at Route 35 and that at County Route 6 have a low clearance, vessels with masts must remain downstream of County Route 6. From Route 35 to the mouth Matawan Creek forms the boundary between Aberdeen Township and Keyport Borough. There are no further bridges downstream of County Route 6 and Matawan Creek empties into Keyport Harbor, an arm of Raritan Bay.

Although not a tributary of Matawan Creek, Luppatatong Creek enters Keyport Harbor very near to the mouth of Matawan Creek.

Etymology
Matawan Creek derives its name from Matawan Neck, situated between Matawan Creek and Whale Creek. During the 17th and 18th centuries this was the plantation of Thomas Rudyard and later Andrew Bowne. This land is now Cliffwood and Cliffwood Beach in Aberdeen Township. It may originate from the Southern Unami Matawonge, "bad riverbank" or "bad hill", a possible reference to bluffs along Raritan Bay which were subject to erosion and collapse prior to the construction of a seawall in the 1970s. Another possible source is Matawan, Northern Unami for "bad fog", which may have referred to fog generated on Raritan Bay.

Geology
William Bullock Clark named the Matawan Formation after exposures on the creek and nearby.

History
During the Jersey Shore shark attacks of 1916, the creek was made infamous due to the shark attacks on July 12, 1916, occurring 1.5 miles (2.5 km) from the ocean. A shark killed 11-year-old Lester Stillwell and his 24-year-old would-be rescuer Stanley Fisher and severely injured 14-year-old Joseph Dunn later that same day.

This account, in addition to shark attacks in both Beach Haven and Spring Lake, were the inspiration for the popular novel Jaws, written by Peter Benchley, who in turn co-wrote the screenplay for the blockbuster film of the same name directed by Steven Spielberg.  Benchley, however, has denied this.

Tributaries
Bakers Brook
Birch Swamp Brook
Clapboard Creek
Gravelly Brook
Watson's Brook
Mohingson Creek
Joe's Hole

See also
List of New Jersey rivers

References

Rivers of Monmouth County, New Jersey
Rivers of New Jersey